In the mathematical fields of differential geometry and geometric analysis, inverse mean curvature flow (IMCF) is a geometric flow of submanifolds of a Riemannian or pseudo-Riemannian manifold. It has been used to prove a certain case of the Riemannian Penrose inequality, which is of interest in general relativity.

Formally, given a pseudo-Riemannian manifold  and a smooth manifold , an inverse mean curvature flow consists of an open interval  and a smooth map  from  into  such that

where  is the mean curvature vector of the immersion .

Gerhardt's convergence theorem
A simple example of inverse mean curvature flow is given by a family of concentric round hyperspheres in Euclidean space. As such, such a family of concentric spheres forms an inverse mean curvature flow if and only if

So a family of concentric round hyperspheres forms an inverse mean curvature flow when the radii grow exponentially.

In 1990, Claus Gerhardt showed that this situation is characteristic of the more general case of mean-convex star-shaped smooth hypersurfaces of Euclidean space. In particular, for any such initial data, the inverse mean curvature flow exists for all positive time and consists only of mean-convex and star-shaped smooth hypersurfaces. Moreover the surface area grows exponentially, and after a rescaling that fixes the surface area, the surfaces converge smoothly to a round sphere. The geometric estimates in Gerhardt's work follow from the maximum principle; the asymptotic roundness then becomes a consequence of the Krylov-Safonov theorem. In addition, Gerhardt's methods apply simultaneously to more general curvature-based hypersurface flows.

As is typical of geometric flows, IMCF solutions in more general situations often have finite-time singularities, meaning that  often cannot be taken to be of the form .

Huisken and Ilmanen's weak solutions
Following the seminal works of Yun Gang Chen, Yoshikazu Giga, and Shun'ichi Goto, and of Lawrence Evans and Joel Spruck on the mean curvature flow, Gerhard Huisken and Tom Ilmanen replaced the IMCF equation, for hypersurfaces in a Riemannian manifold , by the elliptic partial differential equation

Weak solutions of this equation can be specified by a variational principle.

However, the elliptic and weak setting gives a broader context, as such boundaries can have irregularities and can jump discontinuously, which is impossible in the usual inverse mean curvature flow.

In the special case that  is three-dimensional and  has nonnegative scalar curvature, Huisken and Ilmanen showed that a certain geometric quantity known as the Hawking mass can be defined for the boundary of }, and is monotonically non-decreasing as  increases. In the simpler case of a smooth inverse mean curvature flow, this amounts to a local calculation and was shown in the 1970s by the physicist Robert Geroch. In Huisken and Ilmanen's setting, it is more nontrivial due to the possible irregularities and discontinuities of the surfaces involved.

As a consequence of Huisken and Ilmanen's extension of Geroch's monotonicity, they were able to use the Hawking mass to interpolate between the surface area of an "outermost" minimal surface and the ADM mass of an asymptotically flat three-dimensional Riemannian manifold of nonnegative scalar curvature. This settled a certain case of the Riemannian Penrose inequality.

Example: inverse mean curvature flow of a -dimensional spheres

Due to the rotational symmetry of the sphere (or in general, due to the invariance of mean curvature under isometries) the inverse mean curvature flow equation  reduces to the ordinary differential equation, for an initial sphere of radius ,

The solution of this ODE (obtained, e.g., by separation of variables) is 
.

References

 
 

Geometric flow
Differential geometry